Sven Tusan is a 1949 Swedish comedy film directed by Gösta Stevens and starring Edvard Persson,  Emy Hagman and Sigbrit Molin.

Cast
 Edvard Persson as Sven 'Tusan' Jönsson  
 Emy Hagman as Irma  
 Sigbrit Molin as Britt-Marie  
 Axel Högel as Nelson  
 Erik Molin as Verner Berglund  
 Douglas Håge as Simmer  
 Gudrun Brost as Mrs. Winsten 
 Margit Andelius as Woman  
 Astrid Bodin as Cleaning woman  
 Helga Brofeldt as Woman dressed in black 
 Anne-Marie Eek 
 Lars Kåge 
 Mim Persson as One of the Flink sisters, telephone operator  
 Artur Rolén as Man  
 Hanny Schedin as One of the Flink sisters, telephone operator

References

Bibliography 
 Qvist, Per Olov & von Bagh, Peter. Guide to the Cinema of Sweden and Finland. Greenwood Publishing Group, 2000.

External links 
 

1949 films
1949 comedy films
Swedish comedy films
1940s Swedish-language films
Films directed by Gösta Stevens
Swedish black-and-white films
1940s Swedish films